Crilly Hill is the central of three ice-free hills at the north side of McGregor Glacier,  south-southwest of Mount Finley, in the Queen Maud Mountains. It was named by the Texas Tech Shackleton Glacier Expedition (1964–65) for Specialist 6th Class Clifford L. Crilly, a medic with the U.S. Army Aviation Detachment which supported the expedition.

References 

Hills of the Ross Dependency
Dufek Coast